Patrick McLoughney (born 1954) is an Irish retired hurler. His league and championship career with the Tipperary senior team lasted eight seasons from 1975 until 1982.

McLoughney made his debut on the inter-county scene when he was selected for the Tipperary minor team in 1972. After an unsuccessful tenure in this grade he subsequently joined the Tipperary under-21 team. McLoughney joined the senior team as understudy to Séamus Shinnors during the 1975 championship before eventually becoming first-choice goalkeeper. During his career he won a National Hurling League medal in 1979 as well as back-to-back All Star awards.

Honours

 Shannon Rovers
 Tipperary Intermediate Hurling Championship (1): 1986

 Tipperary
 National Hurling League (1): 1978-79

Awards
 All Star (2): 1979, 1980

References

1954 births
Living people
Shannon Rovers (Tipperary) hurlers
Tipperary inter-county hurlers
Munster inter-provincial hurlers
Hurling goalkeepers